Seán Boylan (born 12 December 1949) is an Irish former Gaelic football manager from Dunboyne, County Meath. He retired from his position as manager of the senior Meath county team on the evening of 31 August 2005 after twenty-three years in charge. This was an inter-county managerial record with one team that was only surpassed in Gaelic games by Brian Cody in 2022, his 24th and last season as manager of the Kilkenny senior hurling team.

During his time with Meath, he managed the team to: the Centenary Cup; eight Leinster Senior Football Championship titles; four All-Ireland Senior Football Championship titles (1987, 1988, 1996, 1999); three National Football League titles.

He also managed the Meath county hurling team, whom he also played with for 21 years. He managed Ireland in the 2006 and 2008 International Rules Series.

On 6 August 2020, a documentary called Sean aired on RTÉ about Boylan's life on and off the pitch.

Gaelic games
In recognition of his services to Meath GAA and his services to Meath as a county, Boylan was conferred as Freeman of the County of Meath – the first (and only) person ever to be bestowed with the title – on 23 April 2006. He was entered into the GAA Hall of Fame for his services to Meath football at a ceremony after Meath's Leinster Minor Football Championship victory over Offaly in Croke Park on 16 July 2006.

In August 2006, he was once again nominated for the role of Meath senior hurling team manager, the position he originally expected to have been nominated for when he ended up as Meath's inter-county football manager.

He has also been involved with UCD in the Sigerson Cup and was announced as part of Conor Laverty's Down under-20 backroom team in December 2020.

In 2011, he was ratified as Meath's Director of Football, representing the Meath Co Committee in the sport's development at all levels and having a role in appointing all managers of county teams.

After Colm O'Rourke was appointed as Meath senior manager in 2022, he wrote that Boylan "will have open access to the team as adviser, counsellor, motivator or whatever else he wants to be".

Managerial statistics
All-Ireland Senior Football Championship record as Meath manager.

Honours

Manager
Meath
All-Ireland Senior Football Championship (4): 1987, 1988, 1996, 1999
Leinster Senior Football Championship (8): 1986, 1987, 1988, 1990, 1991, 1996, 1999, 2001
National Football League (3): 1988, 1990, 1994

Meath management roll of honour
 1983 – O'Byrne Cup
 1984 – Centenary Cup
 1986 – Leinster SFC
 1987 – Leinster SFC, All-Ireland SFC
 1988 – Leinster SFC, All-Ireland SFC, NFL
 1990 – Leinster SFC, NFL
 1991 – Leinster SFC
 1992 – O'Byrne Cup
 1994 – NFL
 1996 – Leinster SFC, All-Ireland SFC
 1999 – Leinster SFC, All-Ireland SFC
 2001 – Leinster SFC, O'Byrne Cup
 2004 – O'Byrne Cup

International rules football
Boylan coached the Ireland team against Australia in the 2006 International Rules Series in two games in Pearse Stadium, Salthill, Galway and Croke Park, Dublin in October 2006. Australia won the series by 30 points but the game was overshadowed by violent incidents in the first quarter of the second test match, including a serious injury sustained by Graham Geraghty. He also admitted that he brought his players off at the end of the first quarter in protest and did not want them to return, later saying: "I said I'd do it. Only the players themselves changed my mind. They said they wanted to go out and give it a go, they wanted to play football."

Boylan coached the international side again in the 2008 International Rules Series. Ireland won on an aggregate score of 102–97.

Outside Gaelic games
Boylan's late father, also called Seán, was a leader of the Irish independence movement in the early twentieth century, being a prominent member of the IRA in Co. Meath during the Irish War of Independence.

Like another Meath football icon, Colm O'Rourke, Boylan has strong Leitrim connections as his late mother hailed from near the small village of Cloone near Mohill.

Boylan is a traditional medical herbalist, practicing out of his home at Edenmore, Dunboyne.

He had prostate cancer in 2009. In January 2021, he gave an interview to RTÉ Radio, during which he said he had tested positive for COVID-19 the previous March, lost ten kilograms in six days, and was in Connolly Hospital in Blanchardstown until the 31st of the same month. Less than three months later, Boylan said he was "shocked" after photographs circulated of Dublin secretly training during Level 5 restrictions, breaching both GAA rules and Government regulations.

See also
 List of Irish sportspeople

References

External links
 Hoganstand Meath GAA

1949 births
Living people
Coaches of Gaelic football teams at Irish universities
Gaelic football managers
Ireland international rules football team coaches
Meath County Board administrators
Meath Gaelic footballers
Meath hurlers
People educated at Belvedere College